The following is a complete list of the 345 populated places in the U.S. state of Washington delineated as census-designated places (CDPs) by the United States Census. These include unincorporated villages, groups of villages, commercial developments, and Air Force Bases. Population data are included in the list.

See also
 List of cities in Washington
 List of towns in Washington
 List of undesignated communities in Washington

References

 
Washington
Census